Philippe Dupasquier (born 1955) is an author and illustrator of children's books.  He was born in Neuchâtel, Switzerland, but he went to art school in Lyon, France 1976–79, after which  he became a freelance illustrator in London, England. The detailed crowd-scenes of Dupasquier's Busy Places series were an inspiration for the creation of Martin Handford's popular Where's Wally? series.

Bibliography
 Bill's New Frock by Anne Fine, illustrated by Philippe Dupasquier (1989) 
 The Airport by Philippe Dupasquier, Hardcover, Walker Books, Limited,  (0-7445-0159-8)
 The Building Site by Philippe Dupasquier, Hardcover, Walker Books, Limited,  (0-7445-0160-1)
 Dear Daddy by Philippe Dupasquier, Softcover, Northwestern University Press,  (0-14-050822-8)
 The Factory by Philippe Dupasquier, Hardcover, Walker Books, Limited,  (0-7445-0163-6)
 Garage by Philippe Dupasquier, Hardcover, Walker Books, Limited,  (0-7445-0158-X)
 The Harbor by Philippe Dupasquier, Hardcover, Grosset & Dunlap,  (0-448-19053-2)
 The Railway Station by Philippe Dupasuier, Hardcover, Walker Books London   9 780744 501629 
 I Can't Sleep by Philippe Dupasquier, Hardcover, Orchard Books,  (0-531-08474-4)
 The Great Escape by Philippe Dupasquier, Softcover, Walker Books, Limited,

Awards
For Bill's New Frock, written by Anne Fine and illustrated by Philippe Dupasquier, he received the Smarties Prize, and Carnegie Medal commendation, from the British Library Association, both 1989, and then the Oak Tree Award, from Nottinghamshire Libraries, in 1990.

References

External links
 "My name's Philippe Dupasquier, and I am an illustrator."

1955 births
Living people
British children's writers
English illustrators
Writers who illustrated their own writing